In the 1887 Iowa State Senate elections Iowa voters elected state senators to serve in the twenty-second Iowa General Assembly. Elections were held in 32 of the state senate's 50 districts. State senators serve four-year terms in the Iowa State Senate.

A statewide map of the 50 state Senate districts in the 1887 elections is provided by the Iowa General Assembly here.

The general election took place on November 8, 1887.

Following the previous election, Republicans had control of the Iowa Senate with 31 seats to Democrats' 19 seats.

To claim control of the chamber from Republicans, the Democrats needed to net 7 Senate seats.

Republicans maintained control of the Iowa State Senate following the 1887 general election with the balance of power shifting to Republicans holding 32 seats, Democrats having 16 seats, and two Independents (a net gain of 1 seat for Republicans and 2 seats for Independents).

Summary of Results 
 Note: The holdover Senators not up for re-election are not listed on this table.

Source:

Detailed Results 
 NOTE: The Iowa Official Register does not contain detailed vote totals for state senate elections in 1887.

See also 
 Elections in Iowa

References 

Iowa Senate
Iowa
Iowa Senate elections